Glasgow is the most populous city in Scotland and the fourth most populous city in the United Kingdom.

Population

Glasgow's total population, according to the 2011 UK census, was 593,245.

Ethnicity

The following table shows the ethnic group of respondents in the 2001 and 2011 censuses in Glasgow.

Country of Birth 
The country of birth of Glasgow is as follows;

Languages

The languages other than English used at home in Glasgow according to the 2011 census are shown below.

Religion

The following table shows the religion of respondents in the 2001 and 2011 censuses in Glasgow.

See also

Demography of the United Kingdom
Demography of Scotland
Demography of London
Demography of Birmingham
Demography of Greater Manchester
List of towns and cities in Scotland by population
Subdivisions of Scotland
Wards of Glasgow

References

Demographics of Scotland
Demographics by city in the United Kingdom